The World's On Fire (ザ・ワールズ・オン・ファイア) is the fourth studio album by Japanese rock band Man with a Mission, released on February 10, 2016 through Sony Music Records. It peaked at 3rd place on Oricon albums chart and stayed for 43 weeks. The album received Gold certification from the Recording Industry Association of Japan for sales of 100,000.

The single "Out of Control" features guest appearance from Zebrahead and was nominated for the 2015 MTV Video Music Awards Japan for Best Collaboration, losing to Momoiro Clover Z's "Yume no Ukiyo ni Saite Mi na" (featuring Kiss). "Out of Control" was used as ending theme song for the Japanese release of Mad Max: Fury Road film.

Track listing

Charts

Album

Singles

Certifications

Awards

MTV Video Music Awards Japan

|-
| 2015
| "Out of Control" (featuring Zebrahead)
| Best Collaboration
| 
|}

Personnel

Man with a Mission
 Tokyo Tanaka – lead vocals
 Jean-Ken Johnny – electric guitar and co-lead vocals
 Kamikaze Boy – electric bass guitar and backing vocals
 DJ Santa Monica – electronic keyboards and DJing
 Spear Rib – drum kit

Notes 

 "Survivor" was chosen by Capcom to be the image song for the video game Street Fighter V.
 "Dive" was used as the theme song for Shinjuku Swan film.
 "Raise Your Flag" was featured as the opening song for the anime Mobile Suit Gundam: Iron-Blooded Orphans.
 "The World's On Fire" was used on BMW Mini Clean Diesel commercial in Japan.

 "Give It Away" was used as the image song for Point Break (X-ミッション X-Mission) film.
 "Seven Deadly Sins" was featured as the opening song for the anime The Seven Deadly Sins.
 "Out of Control" was chosen as the ending theme song for the Japanese release of Mad Max: Fury Road.

References

2016 albums
Man with a Mission albums
Rap rock albums by Japanese artists